William Emery  may refer to:
William Emery (priest), Anglican priest
William Emery (MP) (died 1432), Member of Parliament for Canterbury
Bill Emery (engineer) (born 1951), engineer and CEO of the Office of Rail Regulation
Bill Emery (cricketer) (1897–1962), Welsh cricketer